Robert (Bob) Jani (May 25, 1934 - August 7, 1989) was an American event producer who specialized in spectaculars. He is most recognized for his affiliation with the Walt Disney Company and some of its most famous entertainment events. He is also credited with producing the 1976 U.S. Bicentennial Celebration in New York Harbor and the Super Bowl's half-time entertainment. In the latter part of his career, he rejuvenated the Radio City Music Hall stage show.

Early years
Jani was born in Los Angeles in 1934. He graduated from the University of Southern California (USC) with a Bachelor of Arts Degree in Telecommunications and Stage Production and Design. He was 21 when he first joined the Disney organization as the head of the newly created Guest Relations Department at Disneyland in 1955.

Early career
He became Director of Special Events for his alma mater USC after working as the Entertainment Director for the U.S. Army for two years. While working at USC, he is credited with the idea of a Trojan warrior riding Traveler as the school's mascot.

Disney legacy
In 1961, Jani formed Pacific Pageants, his own private event company. However, by 1967 he rejoined the Disney Organization as Director of Entertainment, replacing his predecessor, fellow USC alumnus Tommy Walker. He quickly rose to vice president, and then to creative director of Walt Disney Productions. Jani created much of the live entertainment that has become a standard at Disneyland and Walt Disney World. Among his many achievements were America on Parade and, perhaps his greatest Disney legacy, the Main Street Electrical Parade. The Main Street Electrical Parade was designed by Hub Braden, and the original electric parade units built by a display company in Chicago, Illinois. The Walt Disney Company inducted Bob Jani into its "Disney Legends" program in 2005. Established in 1987, the Disney Legends program acknowledges and honors the individuals whose imagination, talents and dreams have created Disney magic. The Disney organization dedicated a window on Main Street at Disneyland to Jani.

Later career
Bob Jani produced the Richard Nixon Washington D.C. 4 July Inaugural "Honor America Day" in 1976. Bob had his Disneyland Entertainment designer Hub Braden (as a service volunteer Democrat) design the raised show stage platform and framing structure. Braden had his twin brother John Braden (as a service volunteer Republican), an ABC-NY TV staff art director, supervise set construction and installation at the Washington, D.C. Park presentation site. This Washington D.C. Fourth of July celebration has become an annual city, national and televised event.

In 1978, he formed Robert F. Jani Productions, Inc. and left Disney. Through his own production company, he revitalized Radio City Music Hall's "Magnificent Christmas Spectacular." From 1979 to 1982, he was in charge of all live stage productions and reestablished this New York City landmark from its decade of decline as "The Showplace of the Nation."

Among the other spectacular undertakings he produced in the 5,882-seat theater were America, which had a 27-week record run, and Encore and Manhattan Showboat, which received critical and public acclaim.

Jani created the master plan for the opening and closing ceremonies of the 1984 Summer Olympics in Los Angeles, but he did not provide the staging which eventually was awarded to David L. Wolper. Jani was also artistic director for the Hollywood Bowl, producer of several television specials, and master plan consultant for Disneyland Paris and Disney-MGM Studios at Walt Disney World. He worked worldwide as producer and production consultant during his last years. Along with Tommy Walker and Andrea Elizabeth Michaels, he is noted as an event industry pioneer.

Death
Robert Jani died in August 1989 at his Palos Verdes Estates home after a three-year struggle with amyotrophic lateral sclerosis, known commonly as Lou Gehrig's disease. He was 54.

References

1934 births
1989 deaths
Walt Disney Parks and Resorts people
American entertainment industry businesspeople
University of Southern California alumni
People from Los Angeles
Neurological disease deaths in California
Deaths from motor neuron disease